Ram Lal Singh was an Indian politician representing the Communist Party of India. In both 1985 and 1995, he was elected as a member of the Bihar Legislative Assembly from Bhabua. He died on 28 February 2019 at the age of 90.

References

2019 deaths 
Members of the Bihar Legislative Assembly 
Communist Party of India politicians from Bihar